Daher is a village located on the bank of River Purna in Dang district, in the state of Gujarat. It is at 10 Mile from district headquarter of Ahwa. It was the capital of erstwhile princely state of Daher-Amla state. King of the Daher is one of the 5 kings of Dang which are only 5 royals who were recognised by Government of India. Current King of Daher is Raja Tapatrao Anandrao Pawar .

See also
 Dang district, India
 List of current constituent Asian monarchs
 Dangs Darbar
 Raja Tapatrao Anandrao

References

 
 https://cdn.s3waas.gov.in/s3d7a728a67d909e714c0774e22cb806f2/uploads/2018/07/2018070763.pdf

Villages in Dang district, India